Zoran Novaković (born 22 April 1960) is a Bosnian sports shooter. He competed in the men's trap event at the 2000 Summer Olympics.

References

External links
 

1960 births
Living people
Bosnia and Herzegovina male sport shooters
Olympic shooters of Bosnia and Herzegovina
Shooters at the 2000 Summer Olympics
Place of birth missing (living people)
Serbs of Bosnia and Herzegovina